Lowell Area Schools (LAS) is a school district headquartered in Lowell, Michigan. In addition to sections of Kent, its boundary includes sections of Ionia County. In addition to Lowell, the school district includes Alto, Bowne Center, Elmdale, and Parnell. Townships with territory in the district include Bowne, Grattan, and Vergennes.

Superintendent Nate Fowler | 2021 - present

High expectations are established for all students, whose number totals just under 4000, such as having 95% of our general education students achieving at grade level or beyond in reading and math. Research-based practices and data analysis, along with a strong focus on staff development, are used to enhance instruction and student achievement.

From our preschool programs through our Freshman Center courses and senior internships, LAS offers opportunities for all students to learn and excel at their own ability levels. Students are our priority!

Within our district's boundaries are four elementary schools which are situated to serve families living north or south of the city of Lowell, as well as within the city limits. Our Middle School and High School are known for high academic standards and innovative programs. In addition, Unity High School offers a personalized alternative setting for grades 9-12. The Wittenbach-Wege Agriscience and Environmental Center provides science instruction and trails within a natural setting.

Secondary 

Lowell High School
Unity Alternative High School
Lowell Middle School

Elementary 

Alto Elementary School
Bushnell Elementary School
Cherry Creek Elementary School
Murray Lake Elementary School

Pre-K 

 Curiosity Corner Preschool

Science Center 

 The Wittenbach-Wege Agriscience and Environmental Center

References

External links
 

School districts in Michigan
Education in Kent County, Michigan
Education in Ionia County, Michigan